Arthur Joseph Gore (November 13, 1907 – September 29, 1986) was a professional baseball umpire who worked in the National League from 1947 to 1956. Gore umpired 1,464 major league games in his 10-year career. He umpired in two World Series and two All-Star Games.

Early life
From 1927 to 1929, Gore played for the combined Chatham-Harwich team in the Cape Cod Baseball League. He returned to the Cape League in 1934 to play for Barnstable, where he was a crowd favorite, known for his "chatter, pepper, and flashy fielding."

Umpiring career
Before being promoted to the major leagues in 1947, Gore umpired in the Canadian-American League in 1937 and 1938, in the Eastern League from 1939 to 1942, and in the  International League from 1942 to 1946. He umpired in the 1951 and 1953  World Series and two All-Star Games (1949 and 1956).

In December 1956, NL president Warren Giles released Gore from the league to make room for younger umpires Ken Burkhart and Tony Venzon.

Later life
Gore moved to New Hampshire in his later years. He died there after a brief illness in September 1986. He was 78.

See also
List of Major League Baseball umpires

References

External links
The Sporting News umpire card

1907 births
1986 deaths
Major League Baseball umpires
Baseball people from Massachusetts
Portland Mariners players
Cape Cod Baseball League players (pre-modern era)
Chatham Anglers players
Harwich Mariners players
Hyannis Harbor Hawks players